Presidential elections were held in Sri Lanka for the first time on 20 October 1982. Incumbent president J. R. Jayewardene of the governing United National Party was elected, receiving 53% of all votes cast. 

Nominations were accepted on 17 September 1982 and electoral participation was 81.06%. The election was described as a fight between capitalism and socialism: Hector Kobbekaduwa, who advocated to carry on the policies of the previous SLFP-led regime of Sirimavo Bandaranaike, was expected to undo most of the open market and capitalist reforms brought in by J. R. Jayewardene. Although the SLFP lost, they managed to win a significant number of votes in Tamil-speaking areas in the north.

Results

District

References

 
Sri Lanka
1982 in Sri Lanka
J. R. Jayewardene
October 1982 events in Asia
Presidential elections in Sri Lanka